Olga Travnikova (born 25 September 1970) is a Kazakhstani handball player. She was born in Almaty. She competed at the 2008 Summer Olympics in Beijing, where the Kazakhstani team placed 10th.

References

External links

1970 births
Living people
Sportspeople from Almaty
Kazakhstani female handball players
Olympic handball players of Kazakhstan
Handball players at the 2008 Summer Olympics
Asian Games medalists in handball
Handball players at the 2002 Asian Games
Handball players at the 2006 Asian Games
Asian Games silver medalists for Kazakhstan
Medalists at the 2002 Asian Games
Medalists at the 2006 Asian Games
21st-century Kazakhstani women